The Greater Swiss Mountain Dog ( or ) is a dog breed which was developed in the Swiss Alps. The name Sennenhund refers to people called Senn or Senner, dairymen and herders in the Swiss Alps. Greater Swiss Mountain Dogs are almost certainly the result of indigenous dogs mating with large mastiff-type dogs brought to Switzerland by foreign settlers. At one time, the breed was believed to have been among the most popular in Switzerland. It was assumed to have almost died out by the late 19th century, since its work was being done by other breeds or machines, but was rediscovered in the early 1900s.

The breed is large and heavy-boned with great physical strength, but is still agile enough to perform the all-purpose farm duties it was originally used for. Its breed standard calls for a black, white, and rust colored coat.

The Greater Swiss Mountain Dog is sociable, active, calm, and dignified, and loves being part of the family. It is relatively healthy for its size and tends to have far fewer problems than more popular breeds in its size range. Among the four Sennenhunde, or Swiss mountain dogs, this breed is considered the oldest, and is also the largest.

History

Breed history

The origin of the Greater Swiss Mountain Dog is not known. Beginning in 1515, the remote valleys of Switzerland were more or less isolated from world history for three centuries. Specific dog breeds were created by inbreeding, and puppies were given to neighbors and family members.

There are several theories regarding the origin of the four Sennenhund breeds. The most popular theory states the dogs are descended from the Molossus, a large mastiff-type dog, which accompanied the Roman Legions on their invasion of the Alps more than 2,000 years ago.

A second theory is that in 1100 BC, the Phoenicians brought a large dog breed with them to settlements in Spain. These dogs later migrated eastward and influenced the development of the Spanish Mastiff, Great Pyrenees, Dogue de Bordeaux, and Sennenhund breeds.

A third possibility is that a large dog breed was indigenous to central Europe during the Neolithic Period, when humans grew wild and domestic crops and used domesticated animals. Whether or not a domesticated large breed existed in the Alpine area when the Romans invaded, Greater Swiss Mountain Dogs are almost certainly the result of the mating of native farm dogs with large Mastiff-type dogs brought to Switzerland by foreign settlers. The early ancestors of the Greater Swiss Mountain Dog were used by farmers, herdsmen and merchants in central Europe. The breed was bred as a draught dog to pull heavy carts, to guard and move dairy cattle, and as a watchdog and family companion.

Selective breeding

Selective breeding was based on a dog's ability to perform a particular function, such as pulling loads or guarding. The Swiss farmer needed a strong, multi-purpose dog capable of contributing to daily life on the farm. Large, sturdy and confident, the Greater Swiss Mountain Dog is a draft and drover breed that is robust and agile enough to perform farm work in very mountainous regions. The breed was also used as a butcher's dog, having been "popular with butchers, cattle dealers, manual workers and farmers, who used them as guard dogs, droving or draught dogs and bred them as such." Its popularity as a draft dog led to the nickname "the poor man's horse". By the 19th century, the ancestors of the modern Greater Swiss Mountain Dog were widely used in central Europe by farmers and tradesmen.

Renewal of breed

Prevailing theory

At one time, the breed's ancestors were believed to have been among the most popular dogs in Switzerland. It was assumed that the Greater Swiss Mountain Dog had almost died out by the late 19th century, because their work was being done by other breeds or machines, but they were rediscovered in the early 1900s.

In 1908, on the 25th anniversary of the founding of the Swiss Kennel Club (Schweizerische Kynologische Gesellschaft or SKG), two short-haired Bernese Mountain Dogs were shown by Franz Schertenlieb to an advocate of the Swiss mountain dogs, geology professor Albert Heim (April 12, 1849 – August 31, 1937). Heim recognized them as representatives of the old, vanishing, large mountain dog, whose ancestors had been widely spread across Europe, and bred as guard dogs, draft dogs, and droving-cattle dogs.

Heim was a Sennenhund expert, and started to encourage breeders to take an interest in them. These efforts resulted in the re-establishment of the breed. In 1909, the dogs were recognized as a separate breed by the Swiss Kennel Club and entered as "Grosser Schweizer Sennenhund" in Volume 12 of the Swiss stud book. The first breed club was formed in 1912 to promote the Greater Swiss Mountain Dog. The Bernese Mountain Dog and the Greater Swiss Mountain Dog are two of four distinctive farm-type dogs of Swiss origin who were saved from extinction and revitalized by Schertenlieb in the late 1800s.

Secondary theory
There is little information about the Greater Swiss Mountain Dog written before 1907. Until 1913, it was only mentioned in reports by exhibition judges, such as Dr. Albert Heim, who is credited with introducing them into official dog breeding. Heim was sure that the Greater Swiss Mountain Dog was the most widely kept dog in the mountain areas of Switzerland between 1860 and 1870, but the prevailing theory asserts that within 30 years, it had nearly disappeared. Dr. Hans Raber commented on this discrepancy in his book, Die Schweizer Hunderassen:

This theory asserts that systematic breeding did not occur. Farmers did not typically take their in-season females to selected males, so breeding was left to chance. From the litter, puppies who were likable and looked suitable were chosen. Because of this strict selection, and because puppies were often kept in their original neighborhood, the appearance and character of the dogs remained stable. Practical matters were important when selecting the dog and dictated appearance. It isn't known how much attention was given to colors, but it is possible that irregularly or asymmetrically marked dogs were considered less desirable.

Although Heim has said that the big butcher dogs, Metzgerhund, became extinct after foreign imports became more popular, there is speculation over whether farmers would get an expensive foreign dog. In 1889 an International Dog Show was held in Winterthur, northern Switzerland; various Sennenhunde were exhibited. Raber is sure the dogs were present in 1900 as draft dogs for peddlers and people going to market, watch dogs for farmers and drover's dog for butchers; they were rarely tri-colored. Everywhere the dogs had short, rough coats; nearly all were brown, yellow or black with white and brown markings. Lons' description of the northern and central German butcher dog also fits the Sennenhunde at the beginning of pure breeding; this applies to the Austrian butcher dog of Linz, and the French and Belgian Matin. It is to their credit that Heim and Schertenleib selected one variation of the butcher dog – possible the most beautiful – and started it on the road to a pure breed.

In 1908 the Swiss mountain dog appeared for the first time in public. At a show in Langenthal, Switzerland, Franz Schertenleib – a breeder of the Berner – showed an extraordinarily strong, short-haired Berner Sennenhund. He had seen this dog and bought him as an oddity. He was eager to hear what the Langenthal judge, Professor Heim, would say about this short-haired Berner. Heim's first look saw the possibility of a new breed of Sennenhunde. He remembered having seen similar dogs in the 1860s in various parts of Switzerland. He said to Schertenleib, "The dog belongs in a different category; he is too gorgeous and thoroughbred to push him aside as a poor example of a Berner. He is an example of the old-time, almost extinct, butcher dog." Heim wrote in his judge's notes: "Bello is a marvelous, old Sennen (Butcher) hund of the large, almost extinct breed. Had he been entered under "other breeds" I would have recognized him as grossen Sennenhund and awarded him first prize with pleasure. Since he was entered among the Durrbachs, I cannot give this interesting dog more than second prize. This dog is out of place here."

Heim gave Bello the name Grosser Schweizer Sennenhund and dismissed the first representative of a newly named breed from the ring. Heim wrote the first standard based on Bello, and Schertenleib started to search for other members of the new breed. He found two short-haired bitches and breeding began. The first Greater Swiss Mountain Dogs were stockier and rougher than the modern dogs; the skulls were wider than desirable today and showed a marked stop. Judging from old pictures, the coloring was bad; the black coat was mixed with yellow wool at the neck, flanks and rear.

20th-century development
Throughout the early 20th century, the Greater Swiss Mountain Dog population in Europe grew slowly, and it remains a rare breed both in its native Switzerland and the U.S. During World War II the breed was used by the Swiss Army as a draft dog. In 1945 over 100 puppies were registered, indicating the existence of about 350–400 dogs of the breed at that time.

The breed was first recognised internationally in 1939, when the Swiss Standard was first published by the Fédération Cynologique Internationale. In 1968 the breed was imported into the U.S. In 1983 The Greater Swiss Mountain Dog Club of America registry contained 257 dogs. In 1985, the breed was granted entrance to the American Kennel Club (AKC) Miscellaneous Group and in July 1995, the Greater Swiss Mountain Dog was officially granted full recognition in the AKC Working Group.

There are a number of Greater Swiss that have been noted in the media. Network, owned by Sun Microsystems CEO, Scott McNealy, served as their mascot. Mouse, a Greater Swiss Mountain Dog living in Austin, TX served as the mascot of Keep Austin Dog Friendly. Oscar the Grouch, a Greater Swiss Mountain Dog, was featured in the front page of The Wall Street Journal  as he prepared to compete at the Westminster Dog Show. According to the AKC, Greater Swiss Mountain Dogs are 88th in popularity as a breed.

Appearance
The Greater Swiss Mountain Dog is a draft and drover breed; it is a large, heavy-boned dog with incredible physical strength. Despite being heavy-boned and well-muscled, the dog is agile enough to perform the all-purpose farm duties of the mountainous regions of its origin.

Coat

There is black on top of the dog's back, ears, tail and the majority of the legs. There should be rust on the cheeks, a thumb print above the eyes, and also rust should appear on the legs between the white and black. There should be white on the muzzle, the feet, the tip of the tail, on the chest, and up from the muzzle to pass between the eyes. Symmetry in markings and coloring are not a priority in the American Kennel Club standard for the breed. Function and temperament are prioritized as the dog must work. It is common to hear the phrase "the head doesn't pull the cart" or "markings don't pull the cart" to mean that cosmetic features are not highly valued. 

Textures of the topcoat can range from short, straight and fine to longer, wavier and coarser. The under coat is thick and ranges from the preferred dark gray to light gray to tawny, and must be on the neck, but can be all over the body – with such a thick coat, Sennenhunde shed throughout the year and they have a major shedding once or twice a year.

While the Greater Swiss Mountain Dog Standard calls for a black, white and rust dog; they do come in other colors which include blue, white and tan tri-color; and rust and white bi-color. On the blue tri-color dogs, blue replaces where black would be and tan replaces where the rust would normally be. On the rust bi-color dogs, the dog is solid rust and white markings with a total absence of black coloring.

Size
Body length to height is approximately a 10 to 9 proportion; they are slightly longer than tall.

Conformation

Head
Greater Swiss Mountain Dogs have an animated and gentle expression. Their eyes are almond-shaped, vary in color from hazel to chestnut – dark brown is preferred – medium-sized, and neither deep-set nor protruding. Eyelids are close fitting and eyerims are black.

The medium-sized ears are set high, triangular in shape, gently rounded at the tip and hang close to the head when relaxed. When alert, the ears are brought forward and raised at the base. The top of the ear is level with the top of the skull.

The skull is flat and broad with a slight stop. The backskull and muzzle are approximately equal in length; the backskull is approximately twice the width of the muzzle. The muzzle is large, blunt and straight, and most often has a slight rise before the end. In adult dogs the nose leather is always black.

The lips are clean and as a dry-mouthed breed, flews are only slightly developed. They should not drool. The teeth meet in a scissors bite.

Neck, topline and body

The neck is of moderate length, strong, muscular and clean. The topline is level from the withers to the croup – the croup is the fused sacral vertebrae that form the roof of the pelvis and the first few vertebrae of the tail. The croup is long, broad and smoothly rounded to the tail insertion. The tail is thicker at the base, tapering to a point as it reaches the hocks; it is carried down in repose. When alert and in movement, the tail may be carried higher and curved slightly upward; it should not curl over the back. The bones of the tail should be straight.
 
The chest is deep and broad with a slightly protruding breastbone, with well-sprung ribs. The depth of the chest is approximately one-half the height of the dog at the withers, and the deepest point of the chest should lie between the elbows, not above them.

Forequarters
The shoulders of a Greater Swiss Mountain Dog are long, sloping, strong, moderately laid back, flat and well-muscled. Their forelegs are straight and strong.

A dog walks on its toes like a horse does; a dog's pastern and paws are analogous to the back of a human's hand and fingers, respectively. The pasterns slope very slightly, but are not weak. Feet are round and compact with well-arched toes; the feet turn neither in nor out.

Hindquarters
The thighs are broad, strong and muscular; broad, strong and muscular hindquarters, and proper angles between the stifles and hocks are essential for a draft dog to provide powerful rear-drive during movement. The breed standard 'bend of stifle' refers to where the upper and the lower thighs meet. The stifles are moderately bent and taper smoothly into the hocks. The hocks are well let down and straight when viewed from the rear. The hock joint corresponds to the human ankle and first short bones in the foot; the dog does not walk on the heel as people do. Feet are round and compact with well-arched toes; they turn neither in nor out. Dewclaws should be removed.

Gait
The gait of the Greater Swiss Mountain Dog should have movement with a level back. Their gait should have good reach in front with a powerful drive in the rear. Soundness, balance and efficiency which accompany correct structure and good condition are crucial factors in their movement, not speed. Greater Swiss Mountain Dogs were bred to work all day on a farm and need stamina. They are a large breed; because of their history as farm dogs in mountainous terrain, they are extremely agile and this is apparent in their gait.

Temperament
The Greater Swiss Mountain Dog is happy with an enthusiastic nature and strong affinity to people and children. This breed is sociable, active, calm and dignified. While the breed does need exercise, they do not need a vast space. The breed often stands close to their owners, rarely straying far away without checking in. They will not be happy confined to kennel life; they want to enjoy their family. They crave attention and physical contact. Greater Swiss Mountain Dogs are bold, faithful and willing workers and are  eager to please. The Greater Swiss Mountain Dog is confident in nature; the breed is gentle with children. They can be stubborn and determined. The Greater Swiss Mountain Dog is an intelligent breed and is a quick learner. They can be difficult to housebreak, taking up to 6 months or more.

The activity level in the Greater Swiss Mountain Dog is variable. They are capable of being athletic, but usually that activity is in bursts; they are active for short periods of time followed by napping. They want to be with their owners and to participate; their activity level most often matches the activity level of the family. As a working dog, they like having a job to do and enjoy participating in hiking, carting, obedience trials, herding, weight pulling and backpacking with their owners.

Being alert and vigilant, the Greater Swiss Mountain Dog is a good watchdog. They tend to notice everything in their surroundings and are quick to sound alarm. Faced with a threat, they will stand their ground and put on a show that will intimidate those unfamiliar with the dog. Greater Swiss Mountain Dogs are accepting of a non-threatening stranger. They are confident and comfortable in unfamiliar locations, and are stable around strange noises and unfamiliar people. They are accepting of other dogs and species, and are reluctant to bite.

This giant breed matures slowly in both mind and body, taking anywhere from 2 to 3 years. The objective in training this dog is for the owner to build trust through humane methods. As youngsters, they can be quite boisterous and they do require steady and reliable training to develop manners and physical self-control. As with all large, active working dogs, this breed should be well socialized early in life with other dogs and people, and be provided with regular activity and training.

Health
For the most part, this breed is relatively healthy for their size; Greater Swiss Mountain Dogs have far fewer problems than more populous breeds in the similar size range.

Urinary incontinence
Urinary incontinence (UI) is defined as involuntary urination, and most often occurs in Greater Swiss Mountain Dogs as leaking of urine while sleeping; it is a non-life-threatening condition. It seems that more than 20% of the females are affected, usually after being spayed. Incontinence is occasionally found in males as well. Incontinence can occur for many reasons, such as a weak bladder sphincter – generally the most common cause in Greater Swiss Mountain Dogs – urinary tract infection, excessive water consumption, congenital structural defects and spinal cord disease.

Eyelash issues
The two most common eye issues that Greater Swiss Mountain Dogs face are distichiasis and entropion, with distichiasis being the most common issue. Distichiasis is the presence of extra eyelashes along the eyelid. Distichiasis has been reported in 19%, of the breed and in the vast majority of cases it is non-symptomatic and does not cause an issue for the dog. Extra eyelashes can be seen along the eyelid; sometimes extra eyelashes grow so that they irritate the eye.  Treatment varies from vet to vet, some choosing to freeze the affected hair follicles and others choosing to use electrocautery. Most cases do not require any treatment.

Entropion, found in about 3% of the breed, is the rolling in of the eyelids, which causes the eyelashes to irritate the eye. Entropion is a condition that often requires surgery to fix, but once corrected causes no future issues for the dog.

Lick fit
Lick fit is the frantic licking in which Greater Swiss Mountain Dogs can be prone. This has been reported in 17% of the breed. When in the middle of a lick fit, the dog will lick anything they can — carpet, floors, walls — and will eat anything they can find, including grass, leaves, dirt, carpet, and will gulp air and swallow constantly. Their actions make it obvious they are in severe gastrointestinal discomfort. Many owners are able to prevent lick fits by ensuring the dog never has an empty stomach by frequent, smaller meals and large dog biscuits as between meal snacks.

Epilepsy
Idiopathic Epilepsy (IE) is the condition of frequent seizures with no identifiable cause. Seizures occur when nerve cells in the brain become hyperexcited and send rapid-fire messages to the body. Treatment of IE depends on the severity of the case and may involve daily administration of anticonvulsant drugs. IE is present in all Greater Swiss Mountain Dog lines; it typically surfaces between the ages of 1 to 3 years, but it can become evident as early as 12 months and as late as 5 years.

Abdominal health issues

Gastric dilatation volvulus (GDV), also known as bloat, is the greatest killer of the Greater Swiss Mountain Dog. GDV occurs in deep-chested breeds and requires immediate veterinary care. It can be caused by wolfing down too much water, too much food too fast, exercise after eating, stress or unknown conditions. Symptoms are distended abdomen, excessive salivating, depression and lethargy. When GDV occurs it cuts off the esophagus, and blood supply to the heart is lessened causing low blood pressure as well as other cardiac problems; the dog can go into shock. Organ damage can occur as well and the stomach may rupture causing peritonitis to set in. If not treated, the dog may die.

The spleen is located in the left cranial abdomen and is held loosely in place by ligaments. Primary diseases of the spleen are splenic torsion and splenic tumors. Splenic torsion occurs when the spleen twists along the axis of the blood supply. Symptoms of splenic torsion include lethargy, abdominal distension and pale mucous membranes. One theory for the development of splenic torsion is that for dogs with chronic intermittent gastric dilatation, the dilation causes the spleen's ligaments to stretch and increases the spleen's mobility within the abdomen. The spleen becomes torsed because it is no longer anchored in its correct location. This size spleen is not an abnormal finding in this breed. It seems apparent that many dogs of the breed suffer enlarged spleens for no obvious reason other than the spleen may have been constantly twisting, folding and unfolding.

Dysplasias
Canine hip dysplasia (CHD) is the irregular formation of the joint that joins the femur – the longest bone in the body – to the hip socket. The hip is a ball-and-socket joint and the femoral head must fit well into the socket for the joint to function properly. Early signs of CHD include a reluctance to go up and down stairs or to jump; difficulty rising or lying down; and bunny hopping when running – both hind limbs move together. CHD is among the principal orthopedic diseases in the Greater Swiss Mountain Dog; it is rarely severe and crippling. Unless x-rays are taken many owners are not aware that they have a dysplastic dog. A goal for raising a Greater Swiss Mountain Dog from puppyhood is to feed them so they mature more slowly than smaller breeds to help avoid hip and other orthopedic problems in adulthood.

The form of Canine Elbow Dysplasia most often diagnosed in Greater Swiss Mountain Dogs appears to be a degenerative joint disease – a slowly progressive form of cartilage degeneration usually caused by trauma or abnormal wear on the joint. Evidence suggests that most dogs of this breed diagnosed with degenerative joint disease by x-rays of the elbows have the mildest form Grade I. They do not display clinical signs such as pain, stiffness, decreased range of motion or lameness.

Osteochondrosis is a disturbance in the normal development of cartilage; cartilage becomes abnormally thickened, and small fissures and cracks may develop. Dissecans is when cartilage becomes dissected resulting in cartilage flaps, which may remain attached or become loose and fall into the joint space. In Greater Swiss Mountain Dogs most of these cases occur in the shoulder joints and occasionally in elbows and hocks. Except for very mild cases without flap development, the clinical signs are persistent or intermittent lameness. The dog may be stiff after resting and the lameness is usually aggravated by exercise. It is diagnosed by x-rays, and treatment depends on the severity of the case. Mild cases without cartilage flaps may be treated and heal with several weeks of rest and treatment with medication and supplements. Many cases require surgery to remove the flaps and loose fragments, and scraping and smoothing of the defective surface. Surgical repair of the shoulder usually has excellent results, surgical results involving other sites are not as predictable.

Lifespan
Heavier dogs such as the Greater Swiss Mountain Dogs tend to have shorter lifespans than medium- and small-sized dogs; longevity is inversely related to breed size. Two websites list the life expectancy for Greater Swiss Mountain Dogs at 10 to 11 years; another lists it as 8–10 years. A survey by the US breed club shows a median lifespan of 6.75 years. Dog lifespans may vary in different countries, even in the same breed.

Kennel club and pet registry recognition
The Grosser Schweizer Sennenhund, or Greater Swiss Mountain Dog, is recognised internationally by the Fédération Cynologique Internationale (FCI). They are in Group 2, Section 3 Swiss Mountain and Cattle Dogs; standards are dated March 25, 2003. The first standard was published not before February 5, 1939.
The American Kennel Club (AKC) fully recognized the breed in 1995, and classifies them in the Working Group.
The Canadian Kennel Club recognized the breed in 2006, and also places the breed in the Working Group.
The United Kennel Club recognized the breed in 1992; they place the breed in the Guardian Dog Group.
The Kennel Club, based in the United Kingdom, classifies the Greater Swiss Mountain Dog in the Working Group.
The Continental Kennel Club (CKC) lists the Greater Swiss Mountain Dog and provides minimal information about the breed.
The America's Pet Registry Inc. (APRI) does have a classified ad section for Greater Swiss Mountain Dogs.
The American Canine Registry (ACR) lists the Greater Swiss Mountain Dog as an acceptable breed under their American Canine Registry section.
As of May 2010 the breed is not recognised by the New Zealand Kennel Club or the Australian National Kennel Council.

Four breeds of Sennenhund

The Greater Swiss Mountain Dog is considered the oldest of the Swiss breeds. It is the largest of the four Sennenhund breeds; all four have the same colors and markings, but are different sizes.

Evolutionary hierarchy suggests breeds should genetically cluster into groups sharing recent common ancestry. A genetic clustering algorithm could not easily distinguish between the obviously related pairs of Greater Swiss Mountain Dog and the Bernese Mountain Dog.

The four breeds of Sennenhund, with the original breed name followed by the most popular English version of the breed name:

 Grosser Schweizer Sennenhund, Greater Swiss Mountain Dog
 Berner Sennenhund, Bernese Mountain Dog
 Appenzeller Sennenhund, Appenzeller Mountain Dog
 Entlebucher Sennenhund, Entlebucher Mountain Dog

Similar breeds
In addition to the three breeds mentioned in the previous section, Greater Swiss Mountain Dogs are related to other mountain dogs: Boxers, Bullmastiffs, Doberman Pinschers, Great Danes, Great Pyrenees, Komondors, Kuvaszes and mastiffs. The breed probably contributed to the development of the St. Bernard and the Rottweiler.

See also
 Dogs portal
 List of dog breeds
 Carting

References

External links

 
 Historical photos of the Grosser Schweizer Sennenhund from the Bern Naturaidogsarebad History Museum
 More information about geologist and indigenous Swiss dog breeds advocate Albert Heim (1849-1937), including a photo with Swiss Mountain Dogs in 1929 (in German)

Dog breeds originating in Switzerland
FCI breeds
Livestock guardian dogs